Kristina Shermetova (born 25 May 1993 in Ashgabat) is a Turkmen weightlifter. Her best results was a silver medal at the 2017 World Weightlifting Championships in Anaheim.

Biography 
She was born on 25 May 1993, in Turkmenistan capital city Ashgabat. Since childhood, she has been engaged in sports dancing. She started weightlifting in 2007 because of a friend of her father was opened a weightlifting school for girls in Ashgabat.

The first coach is Armen Stepanyan.

Career 

The first international success in her career was the bronze medal of the 2009 Asian Youth Weightlifting Championship in the category up to 48 kg.

Due to injuries, she missed 2015 and 2016 seasons.

2017 turned out to be successful for Kristina Shermetova. The athlete became the third at the 2017 Asian Weightlifting Championships in the category up to 53 kg, and at the 2017 World Weightlifting Championships in Anaheim she won silver.

In July 2021, she represented Turkmenistan at the 2020 Summer Olympics in Tokyo, Japan. She finished in 6th place in the women's 55 kg event.

Major results

References

External links
 
 
 

1993 births
Living people
Sportspeople from Ashgabat
Weightlifters at the 2018 Asian Games
Turkmenistan female weightlifters
Medalists at the 2018 Asian Games
Asian Games silver medalists for Turkmenistan
Asian Games medalists in weightlifting
World Weightlifting Championships medalists
Weightlifters at the 2020 Summer Olympics
Olympic weightlifters of Turkmenistan
20th-century Turkmenistan women
21st-century Turkmenistan women